Balmorhea Independent School District is a public school district based in Balmorhea, Texas (USA). The district operates one high school, Balmorhea High School.

Finances
As of the 2010–2011 school year, the appraised valuation of property in the district was $29,078,000. The maintenance tax rate was $0.117 and the bond tax rate was $0.001 per $100 of appraised valuation.

Academic achievement
In 2011, the school district was rated "recognized" by the Texas Education Agency.  thirty-five percent of districts in Texas in 2011 received the same rating. No state accountability ratings will be given to districts in 2012. A school district in Texas can receive one of four possible rankings from the Texas Education Agency: Exemplary (the highest possible ranking), Recognized, Academically Acceptable, and Academically Unacceptable (the lowest possible ranking).

Historical district TEA accountability ratings
2011: Recognized
2010: Exemplary
2009: Exemplary
2008: Recognized
2007: Recognized
2006: Recognized
2005: Academically Acceptable
2004: Recognized

Schools
During the 2011–2012 school year, the district had one school that served students in grades pre-kindergarten through twelve. The school was a 2004 National Blue Ribbon School.

Special programs

Athletics
Balmorhea High School participates in the boys sports of basketball, 6-man football, tennis and track. The school participates in the girls sports of basketball and volleyball.

In 2016, the Balmorhea Bears football team made it all the way to the 6-man Class 1A Division II championship game, where they suffered their only loss of the season, a 96–50 defeat at the hands of Richland Springs.  They would lose again in the 2017 title game, but would finally win in 2020 avenging their earlier loss to Richland Springs.

See also

List of school districts in Texas
List of high schools in Texas

References

External links

School districts in Reeves County, Texas